Julianne Phillips (born May 6, 1960) is an American model and actress. She began her career as a model in the early 1980s before moving on to acting. She first attracted attention as the first wife of Bruce Springsteen and later for her role as Francesca "Frankie" Reed on the television drama series Sisters (1991–1996).

Biography
Phillips was born in Evanston, Illinois and raised in Lake Oswego, Oregon. Her parents are William Phillips, an insurance broker and executive, and Ann, who raised their children in the Catholic faith. Phillips is a graduate of Lake Oswego High School and Brooks College in Long Beach. She has five siblings: four older brothers and one older sister. She credits her father with getting her into acting and giving her encouragement.

Early career
Phillips began work as a model in Manhattan in the early 1980s. By 1982, she was represented by the Elite Modeling Agency, which characterized her as a "perfect-ten package," earning as much as $2,000 a day. She then moved to Los Angeles, where she appeared in the .38 Special music video for the song "If I'd Been the One." This led to Phillips' acting roles in 1984's made-for-TV movies "His Mistress", in which she co-starred with Robert Urich, and "Summer Fantasy."  She also appeared at the end of then-husband Bruce Springsteen's music video "Glory Days."

Marriage and divorce
Phillips garnered publicity as the girlfriend, and later the first wife, of musician Bruce Springsteen. The two met in October 1984 and were subsequently married in her native Lake Oswego shortly after midnight on Monday, May 13, 1985, surrounded by intense media  Citing irreconcilable differences, she filed for divorce in August 1988, which was finalized the following

Acting career
Phillips continued her acting career during and after the marriage. She appeared in Odd Jobs (1986), Sweet Lies (1988), and Seven Hours to Judgment (1988), and starred opposite Chevy Chase in Fletch Lives and John Ritter in Skin Deep both in 1989.

Two years later, she accepted the role of Frankie Reed, the business-oriented character on Sisters; it became her best-known role. She left the show at the end of its fifth season in 1995, returning for its final episode in 1996. She then briefly returned to movies, appearing in Big Bully (1996), Colin Fitz Lives! (1997), Allie & Me (1997), and the made-for-TV disaster film Tidal Wave: No Escape (1997).

1997–present
Phillips stopped acting in 1997 and has rarely been in the public eye since. In 2001 she was interviewed on an episode of the biographical documentary series Intimate Portrait that profiled her Sisters co-star Sela Ward. In 2014, she reunited with Ward and her other Sisters co-stars, Swoosie Kurtz, and Patricia Kalember, for Entertainment Weekly. The reunion was documented on Today.

Filmography

References

External links

1960 births
Living people
Actresses from Oregon
American film actresses
American television actresses
Bruce Springsteen
People from Lake Oswego, Oregon
Lake Oswego High School alumni
Actresses from Chicago
20th-century American actresses